The 1858 New South Wales colonial election was held between 13 January and 12 February 1858. This election was for all of the 54 seats in the New South Wales Legislative Assembly and it was conducted in 18 single-member constituencies, 13 2-member constituencies, two 3-member constituencies and one 4-member constituency, all with a first past the post system. Suffrage was limited to adult white males. The previous parliament of New South Wales was dissolved on 19 December 1857 by the Governor, Sir William Denison, on the advice of the Premier, Charles Cowper.

There was no recognisable party structure at this election; instead the government was determined by a loose, shifting factional system.

Key dates

Results

|}

References

See also
 Members of the New South Wales Legislative Assembly, 1858–1859
 Candidates of the 1858 New South Wales colonial election

Elections in New South Wales
New South Wales Colonial Election
1850s in New South Wales
New South Wales Colonial Election
New South Wales Colonial Election